Souq Waqif (Arabic: سوق واقف Sūq Wāqif, "the standing market") is a marketplace (souq) in Doha, in the state of Qatar. The souq sells traditional garments, spices, handicrafts, and souvenirs. It is also home to restaurants and shisha lounges. The original building dates back to the late 19th to early 20th centuries in a traditional Qatari architectural style. It was renovated in 2006.

Location
It is located in the district of Al Souq which is situated in the centre of Doha. As it was a market used for trading activities, the area used to be located immediately adjoining the shore to allow for boats to access it. Although still facing the water, the direct link to the water front for boats is now divided by a major road and the recently completed park.

History

The souq was founded at least a century ago in proximity of the dry river bed known as Wadi Musheireb. It was a gathering place where Bedouins and locals would trade a variety of goods, primarily livestock goods. However with the boom in prosperity in the 1990s, the Souq fell into decline and in 2003, most of it was destroyed in a fire. This event initiated a restoration program by the government in 2006, with the purpose of preserving its architectural and historical identity. The first phase of restoration was funded by the Emir Sheikh Hamad bin Khalifah al Thani and his wife Sheikha Moza bint Nasser. Buildings constructed after the 1950s were demolished whereas older structures were refurbished. The restoration was completed in 2008. Traditional heating methods are employed by utilizing wood and bamboo imported from various areas of Asia.

Tourism and attractions
The souq is considered a tourist attraction within Doha.

A yearly spring festival around April hosts many theatricals, acrobatics and musical performances. An event featuring WWE wrestlers, called Souq Waqif Storm, attracted the most spectators. There was discussion over the possibility of a repeat festival.

Pet area 

There are pet stalls in Souq Waqif which sell a variety of domestic pets, including dogs, cats, rabbits, turtles and birds. The sub-par living conditions of the pets has been the subject of advocacy campaigns in recent years, with proponents arguing that the animals suffer from a lack of proper healthcare and exposure to adverse weather conditions. Furthermore, some customers allege that stall owners falsify vaccination records. There is also a separate area in the souq reserved for falcon handling. The falcon souq, as it's called, sells not only falcons but also the needed accessories such as landing pads and GPS guidance systems for the birds. Within the vicinity is also a Falcon Hospital.

Al Rayyan Theatre
A 980-seat indoor theatre known as Al Rayyan Theatre is located in the souq.

References

External links

 The official Website of Souq Waqif Art Center

Doha
Souqs